One Breath may refer to:

 One Breath (Anna Calvi album), 2013 
  "One Breath" (The X-Files), 1994
 One Breath (2015 film), a 2015 German film
 One Breath (2020 film), a 2020 Russian film